Sarafina! or Sarafina may refer to:

 Sarafina! (musical), a South African musical
 Sarafina! (film), a 1992 South African-American film
 Sarafina (The Lion King), a Lion King character
 Sarafina (horse), a French Thoroughbred racehorse

People with the name Sarafina include:
 Sarafina Nance, American science communicator and astrophysicist